is a Japanese footballer currently playing as a midfielder for Lithuanian side FK Šilas.

Career statistics

Club

Notes

References

Living people
1996 births
Japanese footballers
Japanese expatriate footballers
Association football midfielders
Serbian First League players
Shonan Bellmare players
FK Zlatibor Čajetina players
Japanese expatriate sportspeople in Montenegro
Expatriate footballers in Montenegro
Japanese expatriate sportspeople in Serbia
Expatriate footballers in Serbia